The red myotis (Myotis ruber) is a vesper bat species found in Argentina, Brazil, Paraguay and Uruguay.

References

Mouse-eared bats
Mammals described in 1806
Bats of South America
Taxa named by Étienne Geoffroy Saint-Hilaire